Monocrepidius is a genus of click beetles in the family Elateridae. The genus has often been cited as Conoderus, but of the two names for this genus published simultaneously in 1829, the one selected by the First Reviser under the ICZN was Monocrepidius, rendering Conoderus the junior synonym.

Selected species

 Monocrepidius athoides LeConte, 1863
 Monocrepidius auritus (Herbst, 1806)
 Monocrepidius aversus LeConte, 1853
 Monocrepidius bellus (Say, 1823)
 Monocrepidius belti (Champion, 1895)
 Monocrepidius bifoveatus (Palisot de Beauvois, 1805)
 Monocrepidius browni (Knull, 1938)
 Monocrepidius cairnsensis (Blackburn, 1893)
 Monocrepidius castaneus (Fabricius, 1792)
 Monocrepidius concretus (Candèze, 1881)
 Monocrepidius delauneyi (Fleutiaux, 1911)
 Monocrepidius delicatus (Fall, 1929)
 Monocrepidius elegans (Candèze, 1878)
 Monocrepidius exsul (Sharp, 1877) (pasture wireworm)
 Monocrepidius falli (Lane, 1956) (southern potato wireworm)
 Monocrepidius ferruginosus (Fall, 1929)
 Monocrepidius lenis (Candèze, 1881)
 Monocrepidius leucophaeatus (Candèze, 1859)
 Monocrepidius lividus (De Geer, 1774)
 Monocrepidius nigricollis (Fleutiaux, 1918)
 Monocrepidius pallipes (Eschscholtz, 1829)
 Monocrepidius parallelus (Candèze, 1859)
 Monocrepidius pictus (Candèze, 1859)
 Monocrepidius poirieri (Chassain, Deknuydt & Romé, 2014)
 Monocrepidius posticus (Eschscholtz, 1822)
 Monocrepidius rudis (Brown, 1933)
 Monocrepidius rufidens (Fabricius, 1801)
 Monocrepidius scissus Schaeffer, 1909
 Monocrepidius sericeus (Candèze, 1865)
 Monocrepidius similis Schaeffer, 1909
 Monocrepidius suturalis LeConte, 1853
 Monocrepidius vespertinus (Fabricius, 1801) (tobacco wireworm)
 Monocrepidius vitraci (Fleutiaux, 1911)
 Monocrepidius xysticus (Candèze, 1859)

References

External links 

 
 

Elateridae genera